Philip H. "Buster" Tomney (July 17, 1863 – March 18, 1892) was an American professional baseball player for a period of nine seasons, three of which were at the major league level with the Louisville Colonels of the National League from  to .  Tomney died in his hometown of Reading, Pennsylvania in 1892 at the age of 28 due to a lung infection brought on by pulmonary phithisis (tuberculosis), and is interred at Aulenbach's Cemetery in Mount Penn, Pennsylvania.

References

External links

1863 births
1892 deaths
Major League Baseball shortstops
Louisville Colonels players
19th-century baseball players
Baseball players from Pennsylvania
Reading Actives players
Wilmington Quicksteps (minor league) players
Lancaster Ironsides players
Baltimore Monumentals (minor league) players
Syracuse Stars (minor league baseball) players
Binghamton Crickets (1880s) players
Scranton Miners players
Lincoln Rustlers players
19th-century deaths from tuberculosis
Tuberculosis deaths in Pennsylvania